Ranna  was one of the earliest and arguably one of the greatest poets of the Kannada language. His style of writing is often compared to that of Adikavi Pampa who wrote in the early 10th century. Together, Ranna, Adikavi Pampa and Sri Ponna are called "three gems of ancient Kannada literature".

Biography
Ranna was a 10th-century Kannada poet. He was born in 949 C.E. in ancient Belagali, known now as RannaBelagali in the Bagalkot district of the modern Karnataka state in India, to a family of bangle sellers.

Literature
During his early days as a writer, Ranna may have been patronised by Chavundaraya (or Chavundaraya), the famous minister of the Western Ganga Dynasty. With the rise of the imperial Western Chalukya Empire, Ranna became an important poet in the court of King Tailapa II and his successor King Satyashraya who bestowed upon him the title Kavi Chakravarti (lit, "Emperor among poets").

The writings of Ranna are in Halegannada (lit, "old Kannada"). Of the five known major works accomplished by him, two are available in full and one in part. They are: Ajitha purana, Parashuramacharithe (extinct), Saahasabhima Vijaya (also known as Gadaayuddha), Rannakanda and Chakresvaracharite (extinct).

Ajitha Purana (993 C.E.) is a Jain  champu (a form of composition) purana written in twelve sections on the life of Ajitanatha, the second Tirthankar. Ranna wrote this purana under the patronage of a Jain lady called Attimabbe, the wife of general Nagavarma. RannaKanda (990 C.E.), so called because it is written in the Kanda meter, is the earliest extant dictionary in the Kannada language. Only twelve sections of this writing are available. Parusharama Charite (around 980 C.E.) is a eulogy of the Ganga minister and commander Chamundaraya. The poet held his patron in such high esteem that he claims to have named his son "raya" in honor of his patron (who had the honorific Samara Parashurama).

Saahasabhimavijaya or Gadayuddha (lit, "The duel of maces") is undoubtedly Ranna's magnum opus that was accomplished in an age of writings on "heroism", that describe the valor of important personalities (vira rasa and roudrarasa). Written around 1000 C.E. (though some scholars believe it was a product of a more youthful Ranna), it is one of the enduring classics of the language where the poet compares the valor of his patron Chalukya King Satyashraya to the Pandava prince Bhima of the Hindu epic Mahabharata. Ranna keeps with the trend started by Adikavi Pampa who in 941 C.E. compared his patron Chalukya King Arikesari (a Rashtrakuta vassal) to the Pandava prince Arjuna in the classic Vikramarjunavijaya (also called Pampa Bharata). While acknowledging that Ranna may have found some inspiration from earlier writings such as Urubhanga of Bhasa and Venisamhara or Bhattanarayana, scholars concede that Gadayuddha has an originality of its own. Modern scholars see similarities between Ranna's usage of the "adult imps" (called murulgal) that stalk the battlefield of Kurukshetra and warn Kaurava prince Duryodhana (Bhima's adversary in battle) about his impending death, and the description of witches by latter day famed English playwright, Shakespeare. Some scholars believe that Gadayuddha may have been conceived as a play before being completed as a champukavya (epic poem in kavya style and champu meter).

While the theme of the narration centers around the battle of maces between Bhima and Duryodhana on the last day of the eighteen-day war, the poet uses a technique similar to flashbacks in modern cinema to enlighten the reader with important events that led to the war and those events that transpired on the battlefield. Bhima is undoubtedly the hero of the day for slaying his foe and thus avenging the insult suffered by his wife Draupadi at the hands of Dushshasana (Duryodhana's brother) prior to the war. However, Ranna skillfully depicts Duryodhana as a "great soul" (mahanubhava), who despite his sins, was a brave kshatriya on the battlefield, and a true friend to Karna (another important character in the epic).

See also

Notes

References
 
 
 
 
 
 
 

History of Karnataka
Kannada poets
949 births
1020 deaths
People from Bagalkot
10th-century Indian Jain poets
Poets from Karnataka
Indian male poets
10th-century Indian poets